

Hermann Lichtenberger (20 August 1892 – 15 January 1959) was a general in the Luftwaffe of Nazi Germany during World War II who commanded the Flak-Brigade IV. He was a recipient of the Knight's Cross of the Iron Cross. Lichtenberger retired from active duty on 31

Awards and decorations

 Knight's Cross of the Iron Cross on 12 November 1941 as Oberst and commander of Flak-Regiment 104 (mot)

References

Citations

Bibliography

 

1892 births
1959 deaths
People from Germersheim (district)
German Army personnel of World War I
Luftwaffe World War II generals
Recipients of the clasp to the Iron Cross, 2nd class
Recipients of the Knight's Cross of the Iron Cross
Reichswehr personnel
Military personnel of Bavaria
Major generals of the Luftwaffe
Military personnel from Rhineland-Palatinate